William G. Greene Jr. (born April 24, 1940, in Stoneham, Massachusetts) is an American politician, was as a member of the Massachusetts House of Representatives from 1993 to 2011, a Billerica, Massachusetts town meeting member from 1970 to 1992, and Billerica Town Moderator from 1985 to 1992.

References 

1940 births
Northeastern University alumni
Living people
Democratic Party members of the Massachusetts House of Representatives
People from Billerica, Massachusetts